Invergowrie railway station is a railway station which serves the village of Invergowrie, west of the city of Dundee, Scotland on the north bank of the Firth of Tay. ScotRail, who manage the station, provide all the services.

History 
It was built by the Dundee and Perth Railway, a constituent company of the Scottish Central Railway and later the Caledonian Railway and opened in 1848.  It has been threatened with closure on several occasions since the 1950s, narrowly avoiding the Beeching Axe and being reprieved again by British Rail in 1985 (unlike neighbouring , which closed in September that year).

Transport Scotland announced in March 2016 that Invergowrie would be one of several stations to benefit from a timetable upgrade that will see 200 additional services introduced across the Scotrail network from 2018.

The 1900 footbridge is category C listed.

1979 accident 
An accident in 1979, due to a signal passed at danger, killed 5 people and injured 59 others.

The accident 
The 08:44 passenger service from Glasgow Queen Street to Dundee, despite running late and experiencing technical difficulties, left Invergowrie station without incident. However, the brake on the leading bogie of locomotive 25083 was binding, although the driver carried on as Dundee was only a few miles away. As the train was running along Invergowrie Bay a traction motor caught fire and the train (with five carriages) was stopped.

The impact threw the last four coaches of the Dundee train over the sea wall. The last two broke away completely and ended up in the Firth of Tay; fortunately, the tide was out. The class 47 loco was subsequently scrapped due to damage. Both passengers in the rear carriage and the driver and secondman of the Aberdeen train were killed instantly. A further passenger died later and a total of 51 people were injured.

It was reported the next day that the dead included engine drivers Robert Duncan and William Hume. Robert Duncan was 60 years old, lived in Tayport and was a church elder and a special constable. He had a 19-year-old son. His widow stated that Driver Duncan had worked for British Rail since he was 16. William Hume was a trainee driver aged 20 and resided in Fintry, Dundee. He had only worked for British Rail for four months.  Both were in the cab of the Glasgow to Aberdeen train. The other two immediate fatalities were passengers Dr James Preston, a community health officer aged 65, and Mr Kazimierz Jedrelejezyk, a Polish marine engineer. The fifth death was that of passenger Mrs May Morrison who died in hospital as a result of injuries she had sustained in the crash.

Investigation 
The signalman at Longforgan signal box stated that he put the mechanical starting signal correctly back to Danger behind the Dundee train. Around ten minutes later, the Aberdeen train arrived at his box and drew up to the Home signal, which was then cleared for it. The train continued to move slowly towards the Starting signal but, after a few moments, began to accelerate. It passed the Starting signal which, as far as the signalman could see, was still at Danger.  He went down onto the track and saw that the arm of the Starting signal was slightly raised; about 4°. Subsequent investigations showed that it was possible for the arm to have been raised roughly 8°.

The guard of the Aberdeen train said that he had looked out of the window of the rear coach at Longforgan as the train picked up speed.  He saw the starting signal giving "a poor off" (in other words, somewhere between the "on" and "off" positions), estimating that it was raised 7.4°, but assumed that it had already been put back to Danger after the locomotive had passed it and perhaps had not quite returned to the horizontal position. It is not clear if the guard could have seen the starting signal exactly as the driver would have seen it.  The subsequent public inquiry found that the guard was not to blame.

Why the driver passed the signal remained a mystery. The inquiry speculated that he may have been looking back towards the signal box, or checking that the train was clear of the level crossing. As he then looked up towards the signal he might have concluded that it had moved since he had last seen it and that it had, therefore, been cleared by the signalman.  From a position below the signal and fairly close to it, he may also have overestimated the angle of the arm.

Various operating staff who saw the signal before and after the accident also gave evidence that the arm was not properly horizontal, including some who said that the degree of elevation appeared to increase as they got closer to it. It was later found that the signal post bracket was badly bent. The bracket may have been struck by a chain hanging from a wagon, or perhaps by engineers' machinery working on the lineside.

In addition, the signalling at Longforgan was basic and lacking in many safety features.  The Starting signal had no AWS that would have warned the driver of the Aberdeen train, nor was there an adjuster for the pull wire.  There was also no repeater in the signal box, nor was a detonator placer provided.

Facilities 
The station only has very basic facilities. Platform 2 has a small shelter, a bench and a payphone, whilst platform 1 only has a single bench. The only step-free access at the station is between Station Road and platform 2, although the ramp has a moderate gradient. The platforms are linked by a footbridge. As there are no facilities to purchase tickets, passengers must buy one in advance, or from the guard on the train.

Passenger volume 

The statistics cover twelve month periods that start in April.

Services
As of May 2022, There is a roughly hourly service which calls here to both Glasgow Queen Street and Dundee. A small number of extra trains run at peak times to/from Perth, and there are also a few trains to/from Aberdeen or Arbroath to the east as extensions of the service to Dundee. There is no Sunday service.

References

External links 

 Video footage of the station on YouTube

Railway stations in Perth and Kinross
Former Caledonian Railway stations
Railway stations in Great Britain opened in 1847
Railway stations served by ScotRail
1847 establishments in Scotland
Train collisions in Scotland
Transport in Perth and Kinross
Railway accidents in 1979
1979 in Scotland
Railway accidents involving a signal passed at danger
Accidents and incidents involving British Rail
1979 disasters in the United Kingdom
October 1979 events in the United Kingdom
Rail accidents caused by a driver's error